Mangifera hiemalis is a species of plant in the family Anacardiaceae. It is endemic to China.

References

Flora of China
hiemalis
Data deficient plants
Taxonomy articles created by Polbot